Thomas Myron Braatz (May 12, 1933 – October 30, 2018) was a former American football linebacker in the National Football League for the Washington Redskins, Los Angeles Rams, and Dallas Cowboys. He also was the former general manager of the Atlanta Falcons and Green Bay Packers. He played college football at Marquette University.

Early years
Braatz attended Mary D. Bradford High School, where he was a teammate of future Pro Bowl player Alan Ameche. He also practiced basketball and track.

He accepted a football scholarship from Marquette University, where he played as a two-way End. He was named the team's co-captain as a senior.

Professional career

Washington Redskins (first stint)
Braatz was selected in the fourteenth round (159th overall) of the 1955 NFL Draft by the Washington Redskins. He spent two years out of football, while serving in the United States Army during the Korean War from 1955 to 1956 as a crypto operator. He returned in 1957, playing both at defensive end and linebacker. He was waived on October 13, 1958.

Los Angeles Rams
On October 16, 1958, he signed with the Los Angeles Rams to play as a defensive end. After playing in one game, he was released to make room for halfback Clendon Thomas on October 20, 1958.

Green Bay Packers
In 1959, he was signed by the Green Bay Packers. He was released on September 22.

Washington Redskins (second stint)
In 1959, he returned to the Washington Redskins and was asked to concentrate on playing linebacker.

Dallas Cowboys
Braatz was selected by the Dallas Cowboys in the 1960 NFL Expansion Draft. He was used as a reserve linebacker, registering 49 tackles and one interception. He was placed on the injured reserve list on August 29, 1961. He would later announce his retirement.

Personal life
After retiring as a player, he joined the expansion Atlanta Falcons as a part-time area scout in 1965. In 1968, he was promoted to director of player personnel. He was named the General Manager from 1982 to 1985. In 1986, he was reassigned to the post of director of college scouting.

On January 31, 1987, he was hired by the Green Bay packers as the franchise's first Director of Football Operations. The position was created following several disappointing drafts under head coaches Bart Starr and Forrest Gregg. He was later promoted to Vice president of football operations, keeping the position until being fired on November 21, 1991, with the team having a 2–9 record. He was replaced with Ron Wolf. In 1992, he was hired as the Miami Dolphins Director of College Scouting until retiring in June 2003.

In 39 seasons as an NFL executive, he drafted or acquired 45 players who participated in 117 Pro Bowls. His teams played in 17 playoff games. He was inducted into the Pro Scouting Hall of Fame and was awarded the Lifetime Achievement Award from Marquette University. He died on October 30, 2018, in Fort Lauderdale, Florida.

References

1933 births
2018 deaths
Sportspeople from Kenosha, Wisconsin
Players of American football from Wisconsin
American football linebackers
Marquette Golden Avalanche football players
Washington Redskins players
Los Angeles Rams players
Dallas Cowboys players
National Football League general managers
Atlanta Falcons executives
Green Bay Packers executives
Miami Dolphins executives
Miami Dolphins scouts
Atlanta Falcons scouts
United States Army soldiers
Mary D. Bradford High School alumni